This list of St. Thomas University alumni includes graduates, non-graduate former students and current students of St. Thomas University in Miami Gardens, Florida.

References

St. Thomas University alumni